The Indian Journal of Human Genetics is a peer-reviewed open access medical journal published by Medknow Publications on behalf of the Indian Society of Human Genetics. It covers all aspects of human genetics.

Abstracting and indexing 
The journal is abstracted and indexed in:

External links 
 

Open access journals
English-language journals
Triannual journals
Medical genetics journals
Medknow Publications academic journals
Publications established in 1995
Academic journals associated with learned and professional societies of India